Electrochromatography is a chemical separation technique in analytical chemistry, biochemistry and molecular biology used to resolve and separate mostly large biomolecules such as proteins. It is a combination of size exclusion chromatography (gel filtration chromatography) and gel electrophoresis. These separation mechanisms operate essentially in superposition along the length of a gel filtration column to which an axial electric field gradient has been added. The molecules are separated by size due to the gel filtration mechanism and by electrophoretic mobility due to the gel electrophoresis mechanism. Additionally there are secondary chromatographic solute retention mechanisms.

Capillary electrochromatography
Capillary electrochromatography (CEC) is an electrochromatography technique in which the liquid mobile phase is driven through a capillary containing the chromatographic stationary phase by electroosmosis. The capillaries is packed with HPLC stationary phase and a high voltage is applied to achieve separation is achieved by electrophoretic migration of the analyte and differential partitioning in the stationary phase.

See also
 Chromatography
 Protein electrophoresis
 Electrofocusing
 Two-dimensional gel electrophoresis
 Temperature gradient gel electrophoresis

References

Chromatography
Protein methods
Molecular biology
Laboratory techniques
Electrophoresis
Biological techniques and tools